Aeolidiella glauca is a species of sea slug, an aeolid nudibranch in the family Aeolidiidae.

Description 
The body of this nudibranch attains a length of 45 mm. It is orange-brown in colour with extensive fawn or light brown surface pigment both on the dorsum and in a rim around the edge of the foot. The cerata are covered with dense flecks of fawn-coloured pigment. The outer half of the oral tentacles and rhinophores are similarly pigmented.

The body is the host of the ectoparasitic copepods Doridicola agilis Leydig, 1853  and Splanchnotrophus angulatus Hecht, 1893.

Distribution 
This species was described from Berry Head, Torbay, England. It has subsequently been reported from Norway, Great Britain, Ireland, Denmark, and the Atlantic coast of France south to Arcachon Bay.

References 

 Gofas, S.; Le Renard, J.; Bouchet, P. (2001). Mollusca. in: Costello, M.J. et al. (Ed.) (2001). European register of marine species: a check-list of the marine species in Europe and a bibliography of guides to their identification. Collection Patrimoines Naturels. 50: pp. 180–213.

External links 

 Sea Slug Forum listing 
 

Aeolidiidae
Gastropods described in 1845